State Route 86 (SR 86) is a north–south state highway in the U.S. State of California that connects the  Imperial and Coachella valleys in the southeastern desert region of the state. It runs from State Route 111 near the Mexican border crossing at Calexico north through the Imperial Valley via El Centro and Brawley, and around the west side of the Salton Sea into the Coachella Valley. It then goes through Coachella before terminating at Interstate 10 in Indio.

Route description

SR 86 begins at an intersection with SR 111 just east of the town of Heber as Heber Road. After traveling west through Heber and intersecting CR S31, SR 86 turns north and enters the city of El Centro as 4th Street, having an interchange with I-8. Passing through downtown El Centro, SR 86 intersects Main Street (CR S80) before curving to the west as Adams Avenue. The highway continues north on Imperial Avenue before entering the city of Imperial and passing by Imperial County Airport. SR 86 continues north through Imperial before leaving the city limits.

North of Imperial, SR 86 intersects CR S27 before making a turn to the northeast and entering the city of Brawley. It passes to the west of downtown as Western Avenue before turning west onto Main Street and running concurrently with SR 78. SR 78 and 86 turn northwest before passing through the city of Westmoreland and intersecting CR S30. After briefly turning west, SR 78 and 86 turn northwest again and pass through Elmore and Kane Spring before SR 78 turns west towards San Diego County and SR 86 continues northwest along the western edge of the Salton Sea, intersecting CR S22. SR 86 passes through Torres-Martinez Indian Reservation and Coolidge Spring before entering Riverside County.

Just north of the county line in Oasis, SR 86 continues north on an expressway, and turns away from the Salton Sea as it heads through farmland. The route then meets SR 111, and turns northwest, running parallel to that highway. As it nears Indio, the expressway turns into a freeway. SR 86 ends at an interchange with I-10.

SR 86 is part of the California Freeway and Expressway System, and north of the southern SR 78 junction is part of the National Highway System, a network of highways that are considered essential to the country's economy, defense, and mobility by the Federal Highway Administration.

History
In the late 20th century, SR 86 had a rather notorious reputation for frequent and often fatal collisions. For much of its length, especially between the southern tip of the Coachella Valley to the Imperial County line, SR 86 was a two-lane road with easy access from rural side roads. A driver trying to pass might find himself headed straight for the side of another vehicle pulling out from one of the side roads. This reputation earned SR 86 the nickname "Blood Alley".

Originally a part of U.S. Route 99 until the 1960s, the northern end of SR 86 was widened and rerouted through the new and rather unusually numbered "86S Expressway" (for “supplemental”) soon after the signing of the North American Free Trade Agreement (NAFTA), making SR 86 a four- or six-lane highway for most of its length. Since it is easier to enter California from the Imperial Valley than through San Diego, SR 86 sees a great deal of truck traffic to and from Mexico, earning it still another nickname, "The NAFTA Highway". The new highway has proven to be at least as dangerous as the old alignment owing to much the same problems of poorly marked and uncontrolled side roads. A rash of fatal crashes in early 2005 prompted the city of Coachella to push Caltrans for the installation of at least two more traffic signals on SR 86S.

State Route 86S (SR 86S) was an expressway running through the Coachella Valley. In December 2012, the SR 86 designation was transferred to the routing of SR 86S, and SR 86S ceased to exist. State Route 195 was removed from the state highway system as a result. SR 86 was originally truncated to Avenue 46, but the State Route 86S expressway, which replaced SR 86 around the east side of Coachella and Indio, did reach I-10.

Major intersections

See also

References

External links

California @ AARoads.com - State Route 86
Caltrans: Route 86 highway conditions
California Highways: SR 86

086
State Route 086
State Route 086
Imperial Valley
Brawley, California
Coachella, California
El Centro, California
El Centro metropolitan area
Indio, California
Salton Sea
California State Route 086